An-Sophie Mestach and Zheng Saisai were the defending champions, however Mestach had retired from professional tennis earlier in the year and Zheng chose not to participate.

Georgina García Pérez and Oksana Kalashnikova won the title, defeating Anna Danilina and Eva Wacanno in the final, 6–3, 6–3.

Seeds

Draw

Draw

References
Main Draw

Grand Est Open 88 - Doubles